Kessinger Publishing LLC is an American print-on-demand publishing company located in Whitefish, Montana, that specializes in rare, out-of-print books. According to Kelly Gallagher, vice president of publishing services at a bibliographic information company, Kessinger Publishing is part of a group of publishers that "are opening up new publishing venues by producing titles for very niche markets and also bringing public domain titles back to life." In 2009, the company produced 190,175 titles and was reported to be the third-largest producer of "non-traditional" books that year.  

The Register (UK) reported in 2009 that volume 1 of a book by Lafcadio Hearn was not available for a full preview because it was marked as "copyrighted material" and offered for sale by Kessinger Publishing. According to the article, some "scholars were outraged" because the book was previously in the public domain and criticized Kessinger Publishing for making the Internet copy of the book "useless to scholars" by forcing them to purchase it.

References

External links 
 

Book publishing companies based in Montana
Publishing companies established in 1988
Self-publishing companies